Jiro Saito may refer to:

, Japanese voice actor
, Japanese businessman